Let Poland be Poland can refer to:
 Żeby Polska była Polską, a 1976 Polish protest song
 Let Poland be Poland (TV), a 1982 US propaganda documentary